Darren Treasure is a high performance sport consultant. Treasure's past and present clients include sport governing bodies and professional athletes in a variety of sports and in the entertainment field. He has worked as a sport psychology consultant with Olympic, World and NCAA national champions and all-American athletes at a number of different Universities. Treasure currently resides in Portland, Oregon, and serves as the High Performance Director for the Nike Oregon Project. In 2010, Treasure was featured in a Runner's World magazine article for his work with Kara Goucher and Alberto Salazar. He's also been featured in a number of running periodicals for his work with, among others, the American record holder in the mile Alan Webb, and American long-distance runner Galen Rupp, both of whom are members of the Oregon Project.

From 2005 to 2009 Treasure was the author and lead consultant on a high performance initiative in the athletic department at the University of California, Berkeley that is designed to enhance coaching, sports medicine and sport science support systems. Dr. Treasure is the author of the National Federation of State High School Associations core coach education program "Fundamentals of Coaching" launched in 2007 that, as of September 2010, 130,000 coaches had completed.

A former tenured Associate Professor at Arizona State University with an appointment in the Department of Kinesiology and an adjunct position in the Department of Psychology, Darren has held faculty positions at the University of Illinois at Urbana-Champaign and Southern Illinois University, Edwardsville. He has published over 50 scientific articles and book chapters on motivation and the psychology of peak performance and made invited keynote presentations at conferences in France, Norway, Finland and the United Kingdom.

References 

Living people
1965 births